Washington (SP-1241) was a seagoing schooner barge that served in the United States Navy in 1917.

Washington, also named Manuel Llaguno during her long commercial career, was built at Bath, Maine in 1879. While owned by the Luckenbach Steamship Company of New York City and employed in the coastal coal transportation trade, she was taken over by the U.S. Navy for World War I service as Washington on 18 October 1917 and designated SP-1241.

The Navy employed Washington as a seagoing coal barge. Determined to be unsalvageable, she was stricken from the Naval Vessel Register in February 1918.

References
 

Schooners of the United States Navy
Ships built in Bath, Maine
1879 ships
World War I shipwrecks in the Atlantic Ocean
World War I auxiliary ships of the United States
Schooner barges
Shipwrecks of the New York (state) coast
Barges of the United States Navy
Maritime incidents in 1917